Hérault is a department of the region of Occitania, Southern France. Named after the Hérault River, its prefecture is Montpellier. It had a population of 1,175,623 in 2019.

History

Hérault is one of the original 83 departments created during the French Revolution on 4 March 1790. It was created from part of the former province of Languedoc.

At the beginning of the 20th century, viticulture in the wine-growing region was devastated by a slump in sales combined with disease affecting the vines. Thousands of small scale producers revolted. This revolt was suppressed very harshly by the government of Georges Clemenceau.

The catastrophic frost of the winter of 1956 damaged the olive trees, and the olive-growing regions did not recover until the late 1980s. Many of the olive-industry co-ops closed.

During the second half of the twentieth century the Montpellier basin saw some of the most rapid population growth in France.

Geography

Hérault is part of the region of Occitanie and is surrounded by the departments of Aude, Tarn, Aveyron, Gard, and the Mediterranean (Gulf of Lion) on the south. The department is geographically very diverse, with beaches in the south, the Cévennes mountains in the north, and agricultural land in between. The territory of Hérault is often described as an open amphitheater facing the sea. The geography of Hérault is marked by the diversity of its geology and its landscapes. These range from the southern foothills of the Massif Central, to the Mediterranean Sea, through the areas of garrigue and the low plain of Languedoc wine. Hérault has a Mediterranean climate.

The minimum elevation is at sea level and the highest point of the department is at an elevation of 1181m in one of the peaks of the Espinouse. The average elevation is about 227m.

The department of Hérault is crossed by several rivers that originate in the southern foothills of the Massif Central and empty into the Mediterranean Sea, flowing more-or-less from north to south over a relatively short distance from high elevation. The main rivers flowing from east to west are the Vidourle, which marks the limit with the Gard department; the Lesz, which flows through Montpellier; the Hérault, which gave its name to the department, and the Orb, which flows through Béziers. To the west, the Aude, a 224 km-long river flowing from the Pyrenees, has a course oriented west–east and marks the boundary between Hérault and the neighbouring department of Aude. These rivers as well as their tributaries take their character from the region's 'cévénol' climate, with sudden variations of flow causing sudden floods. Lagoons are found along the coast of Herault, the largest of which is the Étang de Thau, with an area of about 7,500 hectares.

The hinterland of the lowlands of Bas-Languedoc is gradually hilly. It is the territory of the vineyard, olive groves, orchards and scrubland. Olive growing and viticulture symbolize an important part of the Mediterranean heritage and lifestyle.

The area of Hérault near the town of Lodève is the geographical antipode point of Chatham Island off the east coast of New Zealand.

Principal towns

The most populous commune is Montpellier, the prefecture. The least populated municipality is Romiguières with 21 inhabitants in 2019. As of 2019, there are 7 communes with more than 20,000 inhabitants:

Climate
The vast majority of the department can be characterized as a Mediterranean climate. However, the mountainous areas of the northwest have an oceanic influence. Some sectors of northern Herault have a temperate continental influence.

The average temperature of the summer months is close to the maximum French average. Nevertheless, the sea protects the coastal areas from the extremes of heat waves in summer, but also frosts in winter. They range from about 27 degrees Celsius on the seashore to 32 degrees Celsius inland. Mean minimum temperatures also vary, ranging from about 19 degrees Celsius on the coast to 15 degrees Celsius in the interior.

Demographics

The inhabitants of the department are called Héraultais. Population development since 1791:

Culture

Language

The historical language is Occitan.

Totem animals and local festivals

The totemic animals of Herault are typical. During cultural events or local votive festivals, many towns or villages parade a totemic animal representing their municipality through the streets, often accompanied by the sound of traditional musical instruments, such as the Languedoc oboe or fife. The most well-known is the "Foal of Pézenas", which UNESCO proclaimed as part of the intangible cultural heritage, being an example of the Processional giants and dragons in Belgium and France.
Béziers festivals : Fèsta d'Oc, Béziers's Feria
Montpellier festivals : I Love Techno Europe, Mediterranean Film Festival, Comédie du Livre, Montpellier Dance Festival, International Festival of Extreme Sports (FISE)
Cazouls-lès-Béziers festival : Festival Piano Prestige, artistic director Jean-Bernard Pommier
Pézenas festivals : Printival Boby Lapointe, Mirondela dels Arts
Sète festivals : Sète's Jazz Festival, Documentary Photo Festival "ImageSingulieres", Poetry Festival "Vivid Voice of the Mediterranean in the Mediterranean"

Heritage

The Canal du Midi has been designated as a World Heritage Site by UNESCO.

Economy

Agriculture

185,048 hectares (nearly 30%) of land in Hérault is used for agriculture. Viticulture is the most important, with 85,525 hectares. The cultivation of cereals uses 20,095 hectares,  grazing 7,090 hectares, 4,991 hectares are left fallow,  3,788 hectares are devoted to the cultivation of vegetables, and 3,400 hectares for orchards (olives, chestnuts, walnuts, plums, apples).

Viticulture

The vineyards of Hérault are very old, dating from before the founding of Gallia Narbonensis. Hérault is today the second French wine department, after the Gironde, representing 14% of the total area of the department. The department has a favorable climate, excellent exposure, a wide variety of soils and many varieties of grape: all these assets result in generous, sometimes robust, wines with a wide aromatic palette

AOC : Saint-Chinian, Faugères, Minervois, Coteaux-du-languedoc, Clairette du Languedoc, Muscat de Frontignan, Muscat de Lunel, Muscat de Mireval, Muscat de Saint-Jean-de-Minervois and Picpoul de Pinet

Aquaculture

In Hérault, the cultivation of shellfish produces 8,300 tons of oysters (10% of the national production) and 5,900 tons of mussels a year. The Étang de Thau is a centre for growing mussels and oysters in the Mediterranean. At Bouzigues, oysters are cultivated on permanently-immersed, raised breeding.

Politics

Composition of the departmental council
The president of the Departmental Council is Kléber Mesquida of the Socialist Party.

Current National Assembly Representatives

List of successive presidents

Sport

Baseball

Basketball

Beach soccer

Football

Handball

Volley-ball

Rugby

Water polo

Specific sports

There are several sports specific to Hérault: tamburello (85% of players are French) and water jousting.

Tourism

Tourist attractions

87 km of beaches
3 World Heritage Sites : Saint-Guilhem-le-Désert Abbey, Canal du Midi and Causses and Cévennes
2 Great sites in France : Saint-Guilhem-le-Désert and Gorges de l'Hérault and Cirque de Navacelles
1 Regional nature park : Haut-Languedoc Regional Nature Park
2 Towns and Lands of Art and History : Pézenas and Lodève
3 villages listed in the Most Beautiful Villages of France : Saint-Guilhem-le-Désert, Olargues and Minerve
2 coastal resorts classified Heritage of the twentieth century : La Grande-Motte and Cap d'Agde
3 Spa town : Balaruc-les-Bains, Avène and Lamalou-les-Bains
19 marinas
541 sites classified or listed as historic monuments

Part of Cap d'Agde is a major nudist resort. Cruising along the Canal du Midi and walking or cycling along the tow paths is a common holiday activity.

See also
Cantons of the Hérault department
Communes of the Hérault department
Arrondissements of the Hérault department
Castles in Hérault

References

External links

  Prefecture website
  Departmental Council website
  Hérault's Official tourist office website
  Official tourist office website

 
1790 establishments in France
Departments of Occitania (administrative region)
Massif Central
States and territories established in 1790